is a Japanese track and field athlete. She competed in the women's long jump at the 1960 Summer Olympics.

References

1937 births
Living people
Place of birth missing (living people)
Japanese female long jumpers
Japanese pentathletes
Olympic female long jumpers
Olympic athletes of Japan
Athletes (track and field) at the 1960 Summer Olympics
Japan Championships in Athletics winners
20th-century Japanese women